The non-marine molluscs of Austria are a part of the fauna of Austria. Austria is land-locked and therefore it has no marine molluscs, only land and freshwater species. This list is based on the current Red List of Austrian molluscs.

There are 443 species of non-marine molluscs living in Austria. Of these, 426 species live in the wild, 60 of which are endemic to Austria. At least 17 gastropod species live only as hothouse aliens in greenhouses, aquaria and terraria. Another 4 non-indigenous species occur only in hot springs.

Freshwater gastropods

Neritidae
 Theodoxus danubialis: Theodoxus danubialis danubialis (C. Pfeiffer, 1828); Theodoxus danubialis stragulatus (C. Pfeiffer, 1828)
 Theodoxus fluviatilis (Linnaeus, 1758) – non-indigenous, along the danube in Upper and Lower Austria and Vienna, first record 2001
 Theodoxus prevostianus  (C. Pfeiffer, 1828)
 Theodoxus transversalis (C. Pfeiffer, 1828)

Viviparidae
 Viviparus acerosus (Bourguignat, 1862)
 Viviparus contectus (Millet, 1813)

Melanopsidae
 Esperiana daudebartii: Esperiana daudebartii daudebartii (Prevost, 1821); Esperiana daudepartii acicularis (A. Ferrusac, 1823)
 Esperiana esperi (A. Ferrusac, 1823) – extinct
 Holandriana holandrii (C. Pfeiffer, 1828)

Hydrobiidae
 Alzoniella hartwigschuetti  (Reischütz, 1983)
 Belgrandiella austriana  (Radoman, 1975) – endemic
 Belgrandiella aulaei  Haase, Weigand & Haseke, 2000 – endemic
 Belgrandiella boetersi  Reischütz & Falkner, 1998 – endemic
 Belgrandiella fuchsi  (Boeters, 1970) – endemic
 Belgrandiella ganslmayri  Haase, 1993 – endemic
 Belgrandiella kreisslorum  Reischütz, 1997 – endemic, extinct.
 Belgrandiella mimula  Haase, 1996 – endemic
 Belgrandiella multiformis  Fischer & Reischütz, 1995 – endemic
 Belgrandiella parreyssi  (L. Pfeiffer, 1841)- endemic
 Belgrandiella pelerei  Haase, 1994 – endemic
 Belgrandiella styriaca  Stojaspal, 1978– endemic
 Belgrandiella wawrai  Haase, 1996 – endemic
 Bythinella austriaca: Bythinella austriaca austriaca (Frauenfeld, 1857); Bythinella austriaca conica (Clessin, 1910)
 Bythinella cylindrica (Frauenfeld, 1857) – endemic
 Bythinella bavarica (Clessin, 1877)
 Bythinella lunzensis (Boeters, 2008)
 Bythinella opaca  (M. v. Gallenstein, 1848)
 Bythiospeum bormanni (Stojaspal, 1978) – endemic
 Bythiospeum elseri (Fuchs, 1929) – endemic
 Bythiospeum excelsior (Mahler, 1950) – endemic
 Bythiospeum excessum (Mahler, 1950) – endemic
 Bythiospeum cisterciensorum (Reischütz, 1983) – endemic
 Bythiospeum geyeri (Fuchs, 1929) – endemic
 Bythiospeum nocki Haase, Weigand & Haseke, 2000 – endemic
 Bythiospeum noricum (Fuchs, 1929) – endemic
 Bythiospeum pfeifferi (Clessin, 1890) – endemic, extinct.
 Bythiospeum reisalpense (Reischütz, 1983) – endemic
 Bythiospeum tschapecki (Clessin, 1882) – endemic
 Bythiospeum wiaaiglica A. Reischütz & P.L. Reischütz, 2006 – endemic, extinct
 Graziana adlitzensis Fischer & Reischütz, 1995 – endemic
 Graziana klagenfurtensis Haase, 1994 – endemic
 Graziana lacheineri (Küster, 1853)
 Graziana pupula (Westerlund, 1886)
 Hauffenia kerschneri: Hauffenia kerschneri kerschneri (St. Zimmermann, 1930)  – endemic; Hauffenia kerschneri loichiana Haase, 1993  – endemic
 Hauffenia nesemanni A. Reischütz & P.L. Reischütz, 2006 – endemic
 Hauffenia wienerwaldensis Haase, 1992 – endemic
 Iglica gratulabunda (A. J. Wagner, 1910) – endemic
 Iglica kleinzellensis Reischütz, 1981 – endemic
 Lithoglyphus naticoides (C. Pfeiffer, 1828)
 Lobaunia danubialis Haase, 1993 – endemic
 Potamopyrgus antipodarum (J. E. Gray, 1853) – non-indigenous

Amnicolidae
 Marstoniopsis insubrica (Küster, 1853)

Bithyniidae
 Bithynia leachii (Sheppard, 1823)
 Bithynia tentaculata (Linnaeus, 1758)
 Bithynia transsilvanica (E. A. Bielz, 1853)

Valvatidae
 Valvata cristata O. F. Müller, 1774
 Valvata macrostoma Mörch, 1864
 Valvata piscinalis: Valvata piscinalis alpestris Küster, 1852; Valvata piscinalis antiqua Morris, 1838; Valvata piscinalis piscinalis O. F. Müller, 1774
 Valvata studeri Boeters & Falkner, 1998
 Borysthenia naticina (Menke, 1845)

Acroloxidae
 Acroloxus lacustris (Linnaeus, 1758)

Lymnaeidae
 Galba truncatula  (O. F. Müller, 1774)
 Stagnicola corvus (Gmelin, 1791)
 Stagnicola fuscus  (C. Pfeiffer, 1821)
 Stagnicola palustris s. str. – non-indigenous
 Stagnicola turricula (Held, 1836)
 Radix ampla (Hartmann, 1821)
 Radix auricularia (Linnaeus, 1758)
 Radix balthica  (Linnaeus, 1758)
 Radix labiata (Draparnaud, 1805)
 Radix lagotis (Schrank, 1803)
 Lymnaea stagnalis (Linnaeus, 1758)

Physidae
 Aplexa hypnorum (Linnaeus, 1758)
 Physa fontinalis (Linnaeus, 1758)
 Physella acuta (Draparnaud, 1805) – non-indigenous
 Physella gyrina (Say, 1821) – non-indigenous

Planorbidae
 Ancylus fluviatilis O. F. Müller, 1774
 Anisus leucostoma  (Millet, 1813)
 Anisus spirorbis (Linnaeus, 1758)
 Anisus vortex (Linnaeus, 1758)
 Anisus vorticulus (Troschel, 1834)
 Bathyomphalus contortus (Linnaeus, 1758)
 Ferrissia fragilis (Tryon, 1863)
 Gyraulus acronicus (A. Ferrusac, 1807)
 Gyraulus albus (O. F. Müller, 1774)
 Gyraulus chinensis (Dunker, 1848) – non-indigenous
 Gyraulus laevis  (Adler, 1838)
 Gyraulus parvus (Say, 1817) – non-indigenous
 Gyraulus rossmaessleri (Auerswald, 1852)
 Gyraulus crista (Linnaeus, 1758)
 Hippeutis complanatus (Linnaeus, 1758)
 Planorbarius corneus (Linnaeus, 1758)
 Planorbis planorbis (Linnaeus, 1758)
 Planorbis carinatus O. F. Müller, 1774
 Segmentina nitida (O. F. Müller, 1774)

Land gastropods
Cochlostomatidae
 Cochlostoma anomphale Boeckel, 1939	
 Cochlostoma gracile stussineri (A. J. Wagner, 1897)
 Cochlostoma henricae: Cochlostoma henricae henricae (Strobel, 1851), Cochlostoma henricae huettneri (A. J. Wagner, 1895)
 Cochlostoma nanum (Westerlund, 1879)
 Cochlostoma septemspirale: Cochlostoma septemspirale septemspirale (Razoumovsky, 1789), Cochlostoma septemspirale heydenianum (Clessin, 1789)
 Cochlostoma tergestinum (Westerlund, 1878)	
 Cochlostoma waldemari (A. J. Wangner, 1897)	

Pomatiidae
 Pomatias elegans (O. F. Müller, 1774)- non-indigenous

Aciculidae
 Acicula lineata (Draparnaud, 1801)

 Acicula lineolata banki Boeters, Gittenberger & Subai 1993
 Platyla gracilis (Clessin, 1877)
 Platyla polita (Hartmann, 1840)
 Renea veneta (Pirona, 1865)

Carychiidae
 Carychium minimum O. F. Müller, 1774
 Carychium tridentatum (Risso, 1826)
 Zospeum alpestre: Zospeum alpestre isselianum (Pollonera, 1886), Zospeum alpestre kupitzense Stummer, 1984

Succineidae
 Succinella oblonga (Draparnaud, 1801)
 Succinea putris (Linné 1758)
 Oxyloma elegans (Risso, 1826)
 Oxyloma sarsii (Esmark, 1886)

Cochlicopidae
 Cochlicopa lubrica (O. F. Müller, 1774)
 Cochlicopa lubricella (Rossmässler, 1834)
 Cochlicopa nitens (M. v. Gallenstein, 1848)
 Cochlicopa repentina Hudec 1960

Orculidae
 Odontocyclas kokeilii (Rossmässler, 1837)
 Orcula austriaca – endemic: Orcula austriaca austriaca S. Zimmermann, 1932; Orcula austriaca faueri Klemm, 1967; Orcula austriaca goelleri Gittenberger, 1967; Orcula austriaca pseudofuchsi Klemm, 1967
 Orcula conica (Rossmässler, 1837)
 Orcula dolium: Orcula dolium dolium (Draparnaud, 1801); Orcula dolium edita Pilsbry, 1934 – endemic; Orcula dolium gracilior S. Zimmermann – endemic; Orcula dolium infima Pilsbry, 1934 – endemic; Orcula dolium pseudogularis A. J. Wagner 1912 – endemic
 Orcula pseudodolium A.J. Wagner, 1912 – endemic
 Orcula fuchsi S. Zimmermann, 1931 – endemic
 Orcula gularis including Orcula gularis gularis (Rossmässler, 1837), Orcula gularis oreina Pilsbry, 1934 – endemic
 Orcula restituta (Westerlund, 1887)
 Orcula tolminensis A. J. Wagner, 1912
 Pagodulina pagodula: Pagodulina pagodula altilis Klemm, 1939; Pagodulina pagodula principalis Klemm, 1939
 Pagodulina sparsa Pilsbry, 1924
 Pagodulina subdola: Pagodulina subdola subdola (Gredler, 1856); Pagodulina subdola superstes Klemm, 1939
 Sphyradium doliolum (Bruguiere, 1792)

Argnidae
 Agardhiella truncatella (L. Pfeifer, 1841)
 Argna biplicata excessiva (Gredler, 1856)

Strobilopsidae
 Gittenbergia sororcula (Benoit, 1859)

Valloniidae
 Acanthinula aculeata (O. F. Müller, 1774)
 Vallonia costata (O. F. Müller, 1774)
 Vallonia declivis Sterki, 1893
 Vallonia enniensis (Gredler, 1856)
 Vallonia excentrica Sterki, 1893
 Vallonia pulchella (O. F. Müller, 1774)
 Vallonia suevica geyer, 1908

Pupillidae
 Pupilla alpicola (Charpentier, 1837)
 Pupilla bigranata (Rossmässler, 1839)
 Pupilla muscorum (Linnaeus, 1758)
 Pupilla sterrii (Voith, 1840)
 Pupilla triplicata (Studer, 1820)

Pyramidulidae
 Pyramidula pusilla (Vallot, 1801)

Chondrinidae
 Abida secale (Draparnaud, 1801)
 Chondrina avenacea: Chondrina avenacea avenacea (Brugiere, 1792); Chondrina avenacea lepta (Westerlund, 1887)
 Chondrina arcadia clienta (Westerlund, 1883)
 Chondrina megacheilos burtscheri Falkner& Stummer, 1996
 Granaria frumentum (Draparnaud, 1801)
 Granaria illyrica (Rossmässler, 1835)

Vertiginidae
 Columella aspera Waldén, 1966
 Columella columella (G. V. Martens, 1830)
 Columella edentula (Draparnaud, 1805)
 Truncatellina callicratis (Scacchi, 1833)
 Truncatellina claustralis (Gredler, 1856)
 Truncatellina costulata (Nilsson, 1823)
 Truncatellina cylindrica (A. Ferrusac, 1807)
 Truncatellina monodon (Held 1837)
 Vertigo alpestris Alder, 1838

 Vertigo angustior Jeffreys, 1830
 Vertigo antivertigo (Draparnaud, 1801)
 Vertigo genesii (Gredler, 1856)
 Vertigo geyeri Lindholm, 1925
 Vertigo heldi (Clessin, 1877)
 Vertigo modesta tirolensis (Gredler, 1869)
 Vertigo moulinsiana (Dupuy, 1849)
 Vertigo pusilla O. F. Müller, 1774
 Vertigo pygmaea (Draparnaud, 1801)
 Vertigo substriata (Jeffreys, 1833)

Enidae
 Chondrula tridens (O. F. Müller, 1774)
 Ena montana (Draparnaud, 1801)
 Jaminia quadridens (O. F. Müller, 1774)
 Merdigera obscura (O. F. Müller, 1774)
 Zebrina detrita (O. F. Müller, 1774)

Clausiliidae
 Balea biplicata: Balea biplicata biplicata (Montagu, 1803); Balea biplicata sordida (Rossmässler, 1835); Balea biplicata chuenringorum (Tschapeck, 1890)
 Balea perversa (Linnaeus, 1758)
 Bulgarica cana (Held, 1836)
 Bulgarica vetusta (Rossmässler, 1836)
 Charpentieria itala: Charpentieria itala braunii (Rossmässler, 1836); Charpentieria itala punctata (Michaud, 1831) – non-indigenous
 Charpentieria ornata (Rossmässler, 1836)
 Charpentieria stenzii cincta (Brumati, 1838)
 Clausilia cruciata: Clausilia cruciata cruciata (S. Studer, 1820); Clausilia cruciata cuspidata Held, 1836; Clausilia cruciata minima A. Schmidt, 1856; Clausilia cruciata geminella Klemm, 1972
 Clausilia dubia: Clausilia dubia dubia Draparnaud, 1805; Clausilia dubia vindobonensis A. Schmidt, 1856; Clausilia dubia speciosa  A. Schmidt, 1856; Clausilia dubia huettneri Klemm, 1960; Clausilia dubia schlechtii A. Schmidt, 1856;Clausilia dubia tettelbachiana Rossmässler, 1838; Clausilia dubia kaeufeli Klemm, 1960; Clausilia dubia gracilior Clessin, 1887; Clausilia dubia grimmeri L. Pfeiffer, 1848; Clausilia dubia otvinensis H. V. Gallenstein, 1895; Clausilia dubia floningiana Westerlund, 1888; Clausilia dubia bucculenta Klemm, 1960;Clausilia dubia runensis Tschapeck, 1883; Clausilia dubia moldanubica Klemm, 1960; Clausilia dubia dydima F.J. Schmidt, 1847; Clausilia dubia steinbergensis Edlinger, 2000
 Clausilia pumila C. Pfeiffer, 1828
 Clausilia rugosa parvula A. Ferussac, 1807
 Cochlodina costata commutata (Rossmässler, 1836)
 Cochlodina dubiosa (Clessin, 1882)
 Cochlodina fimbriata (Rossmässler,  1835)
 Cochlodina laminata: Cochlodina laminata laminata (Montagu, 1803); Cochlodina laminata insulana Gittenberger, 1967
 Cochlodina orthostoma (Menke, 1828)
 Dilataria succineata (Rossmässler, 1836)
 Erjavecia bergeri (Rossmässler, 1836)
 Fusulus interruptus (C. Pfeiffer, 1828)
 Fusulus approximans (A. Schmidt, 1856)
 Herilla bosniensis (L. Pfeiffer, 1868) – non-indigenous
 Julica schmidtii rablensis (M. Gallenstein, 1852)
 Laciniaria plicata (Draparnaud, 1801)
 Macrogastra asphaltina (Rossmässler, 1836)
 Macrogastra attenuata: Macrogastra attenuata attenuata (Rossmässler, 1835); Macrogastra attenuata lineolata (Held, 1836)
 Macrogastra badia: Macrogastra badia badia (C. Pfeiffer, 1828); Macrogastra badia suprema (Klemm, 1969); Macrogastra badia crispulata (Westerlund, 1884); Macrogastra badia mucida (Rossmässler, 1835);  Macrogastra badia carinthiaca (A. Sschmidt, 1856);  Macrogastra badia fontana (L. Pfeiffer, 1848);  Macrogastra badia cacuminis (Klemm, 1969)
 Macrogastra densestriata: Macrogastra densestriata densestriata (Rossmässler, 1836);  Macrogastra densestriata gredleri Nordsiek, 1993

 Macrogastra plicatula: Macrogastra plicatula plicatula (Draparnaud, 1801);  Macrogastra plicatula grossa (Westerlund, 1878);  Macrogastra plicatula rusiostoma (Held, 1836);  Macrogastra plicatula iniuncta (L. Pfeiffer, 1849); Macrogastra plicatula convallicola (Westerlund, 1878);  Macrogastra plicatula senex (Westerlund, 1878);  Macrogastra plicatula superflua (Charpentier, 1852); Macrogastra plicatula alpestris (Clessin, 1878)
 Macrogastra tumida (Rossmässler, 1836)
 Macrogastra ventricosa: Macrogastra ventricosa ventricosa (Draparnaud, 1801); Macrogastra ventricosa major (Rossmässler, 1836)
 Medora macascarensis carniolica (Küster, 1854) – non-indigenous
 Neostyriaca corynodes: Neostyriaca corynodes corynodes (Held, 1836); Neostyriaca corynodes saxatilis (Hartmann, 1844); Neostyriaca corynodes brandti (Klemm, 1969); Neostyriaca corynodes styriaca (A. Schmidt, 1856); Neostyriaca corynodes evadens (Klemm, 1969); Neostyriaca corynodes conclusa (Klemm, 1969)
 Pseudofusulus varians (C. Pfeiffer, 1828)
 Ruthenica filograna (Rossmässler, 1836)

Ferussaciidae
 Cecilioides acicula (O. F. Müller, 1774)
 Cecilioides petitianus (Benoit, 1862)

Punctidae 
 Punctum pygmaeum (Draparnaud, 1801)
 Lucilla inermis (H. B. Baker, 1929)

Discidae 
 Discus perspectivus (M. V. Mühlfeld 1816)
 Discus rotundatus (O. F. Müller, 1774)
 Discus ruderatus (A. Ferrusac, 1821)

Pristilomatidae 
 Vitrea contracta (Westerlund, 1871)
 Vitrea crystallina (O. F. Müller, 1774)
 Vitrea diaphana Vitrea diaphana diaphana (S. Studer, 1820), Vitrea diaphana erjaveci (Brusina, 1870)
 Vitrea subrimata (Reinhardt, 1871)
 Vitrea transsylvanica (Clessin 1877)

Euconulidae 
 Euconulus fulvus (O. F. Müller, 1774)
 Euconulus praticola (Reinhardt, 1883)
 Euconulus trochiformis (Montagu, 1803)

Gastrodontidae 
 Zonitoides nitidus (O. F. Müller, 1774)

Oxychilidae 
 Aegopinella epipedostoma juncta (Hudec 1964)
 Aegopinella forcarti Jungbluth, 1983
 Aegopinella minor (Stabile, 1864)
 Aegopinella nitens (Michaud, 1831)
 Aegopinella pura (Alder, 1830)
 Aegopinella ressmanni (Westerlund, 1883
 Daudebardia brevipes (Draparnaud, 1805)
 Daudebardia rufa (Draparnaud, 1805)
 Carpathica stussineri (A. J. Wagner, 1895)
 Oxychilus alliarius (Miller 1822)
 Oxychilus cellarius (O. F. Müller, 1774)
 Oxychilus clarus (Held, 1838)
 Oxychilus depressus (Sterki, 1880)
 Oxychilus draparnaudi (Beck, 1837)
 Oxychilus glaber : Oxychilus glaber glaber (Rossmässler, 1835); Oxychilus glaber striarius (Westerlund, 1881)
 Oxychilus hydatinus (Rossmässler, 1838) – non-indigenous

 Oxychilus inopinatus (Ulicny, 1887)
 Oxychilus mortilleti (L. Pfeiffer, 1859))
 Perpolita hammonis (Ström, 1765)
 Perpolita petronella (L. Pfeiffer, 1853)

Zonitidae
 Aegopis verticillus (Lamarck, 1822)

Milacidae
 Milax gagates (Draparnaud, 1801) – non-indigenous
 Tandonia budapestensis (Hazay, 1880)- non-indigenous
 Tandonia ehrmanni (Simroth, 1910)
 Tandonia kusceri (H. Wagner, 1931) – non-indigenous
 Tandonia robici (Simroth, 1885)
 Tandonia rustica (Millet, 1843)

Limacidae
 Limax cinereoniger Wolf, 1803
 Limax maximus Linnaeus, 1758
 Limax albipes Dumont & Mortillet 1853
 Limacus flavus (Linnaeus, 1758)
 Malacolimax tenellus (O. F. Müller 1774)
 Malacolimax kostalii Babor, 1900
 Lehmannia janetscheki Forcart, 1966
 Lehmannia marginata (O. F. Müller, 1774)
 Lehmannia rupicola Lessona & Pollonera, 1882

Agriolimacidae
 Deroceras agreste (Linnaeus, 1758)
 Deroceras golcheri  aff. Regteren-Altena, 1962
 Deroceras invadens Reise, Hutchinson, Schunack & Schlitt, 2011– non-indigenous
 Deroceras klemmi Grossu, 1972
 Deroceras laeve (O. F. Müller, 1774)
 Deroceras reticulatum (O. F. Müller, 1774)
 Deroceras rodnae: Deroceras rodnae rodnae Grossu & Lupu 1965, Deroceras rodnae juranum Wüthrich, 1993
 Deroceras sturanyi (Simroth, 1894)
 Deroceras turcicum (Simroth, 1894)

Boettgerillidae
 Boettgerilla pallens Simroth, 1912

Vitrinidae
 Eucobresia diaphana (Draparnaud, 1805)
 Eucobresia glacialis (Forbes, 1837)
 Eucobresia nivalis (Dumont & Mortillet, 1854)
 Eucobresia pegorarii (Pollonera, 1884)
 Gallandia annularis (S. Studer 1820)
 Semilimax carinthiacus (Westerlund, 1886)
 Semilimax kotulae (Westerlund, 1883)
 Semilimax semilimax (J. Ferussac, 1802)
 Vitrina carniolica  O. Boettger, 1884
 Vitrina pellucida (O. F. Müller, 1774)
 Vitrinobrachium breve (A. Ferussac, 1821)

Arionidae
 Arion obesoductus Reischütz, 1973
 Arion brunneus Lehmann, 1862
 Arion circumscriptus Johnston, 1828
 Arion distinctus Mabille, 1868
 Arion fasciatus (Nilsson, 1823)
 Arion flagellus Collinge, 1893 – non-indigenous
 Arion fuscus' '(O. F. Müller, 1774)  agg.
 Arion hortensis A. Ferussac, 1819 – non-indigenous
 Arion intermedius Normand, 1852 – non-indigenous
 Arion rufus (Linnaeus, 1758)
 Arion silvaticus Lohmander, 1937
 Arion vulgaris Moquin-Tandon, 1855 – non-indigenous

Geomitridae
 Candidula unifasciata: Candidula unifasciata unifasciata (Poiret, 1801); Candidula unifasciata soosiana (H. Wagner, 1933)
 Cernuella cisalpina (Rossmässler, 1837) – non-indigenous
 Cernuella neglecta (Draparnaud, 1805) – non-indigenous
 Cernuella virgata (Da Costa, 1778) – non-indigenous
 Helicella itala (Linnaeus, 1758)
 Helicopsis austriaca Gittenberger, 1969 – endemic
 Helicopsis hungarica (Soos & Wagner, 1935)
 Helicopsis striata (O. F. Müller, 1774)
 Xerolenta obvia (Menke, 1828)

Hygromiidae
 Euomphalia strigella (Draparnaud, 1801)
 Hygromia cinctella  (Draparnaud, 1801) – non-indigenous
 Monacha cantiana (Montagu, 1803) – non-indigenous
 Monacha cartusiana (O. F. Müller, 1774)
 Monachoides incarnatus (O. F. Müller, 1774)
 Perforatella bidentata (Gmelin, 1791)
 Petasina edentula: Petasina edentula helvetica (Polinski, 1929); Petasina edentula limnifera (Held, 1836); Petasina edentula subleucozona (Westerlund, 1889)
 Petasina filicina: Petasina filicina filicina (L. Pfeiffer, 1841); Petasina filicina styriaca (Klemm, 1954) – endemic

 Petasina leucozona: Petasina leucozona heteromorpha (Westerlund, 1876), Petasina leucozona leucozona (C. Pfeiffer, 1828); Petasina leucozona ovirensis (Rossmässler, 1838)
 Petasina lurida (C. Pfeiffer, 1828)
 Petasina subtecta (Polinski, 1929) – endemic
 Petasina unidentata: Petasina unidentata alpestris (Clessin, 1878), Petasina unidentata norica (Polinski, 1929); Petasina unidentata subalpestris (Polinski, 1929); Petasina unidentata unidentata (Draparnaud, 1805)
 Plicuteria lubomirskii (Slosarski, 1881) – regionally extinct
 Pseudotrichia rubiginosa (Rossmässler, 1838)
 Noricella oreinos (Wagner, 1915) – endemic
 Noricella scheerpeltzi (Mikula, 1954) – endemic
 Trochulus clandestinus (Hartmann, 1821)
 Trochulus coelomphala (Loccard, 1888)
 Trochulus hispidus (Linnaeus, 1758)
 Trochulus sericeus (Draparnaud, 1801)
 Trochulus striolatus: Trochulus striolatus austriacus (Mahler, 1952) – endemic; Trochulus striolatus danubialis (Clessin, 1874); Trochulus striolatus  juvavensis – endemic (Geyer, 1914)
 Trochulus suberectus  (Clessin, 1878)
 Urticicola umbrosus (C. Pfeiffer, 1828)

Bradybaenidae
 Fruticicola fruticum (O. F. Müller, 1774)

Helicodontidae
 Helicodonta obvoluta (O. F. Müller, 1774)

Helicidae
 Arianta arbustorum: Arianta arbustorum arbustorum (Linnaeus, 1758); Arianta arbustorum alpicola (A. Ferrusac, 1821); Arianta arbustorum styriaca (Kobelt, 1876); Arianta arbustorum picea (Rossmässler, 1837)
 Arianta stenzii (Rossmässler, 1835)
 Arianta chamaeleon: Arianta chamaeleon chamaeleon (L. Pfeiffer, 1842); Arianta chamaeleon subglobosa (Ehrmann, 1910); Arianta chamaeleon carnica (Ehrmann, 1910); Arianta chamaeleon wiedemayri (Kobelt, 1903)
 Arianta schmidtii (Rossmässler, 1836)
 Helicigona lapicida (Linnaeus, 1758)
 Chilostoma illyrica (Stabile, 1864)
 Chilostoma cingulatum: Chilostoma cingulatum preslii (Rossmässler, 1836); Chilostoma cingulatum peregrini Falkner, 1998; Chilostoma cingulatum carrarense (Strobel, 1852) – non-indigenous
 Chilostoma achates: Chilostoma achates achates (Rossmässler, 1835); Chilostoma achates cingulina (Deshayes, 1839); Chilostoma achates stiriae (Forcart, 1933); Chilostoma achates rhaeticum (Strobel, 1857)
 Chilostoma intermedium (A. Ferrussac, 1832)
 Chilostoma ziegleri (Rossmässler, 1836)
 Cylindrus obtusus (Draparnaud, 1805) – endemic
 Isognomostoma isognomostomos (Schröter, 1784)
 Caucasotachea vindobonensis (C. Pfeiffer, 1828)
 Causa holosericea (S. Studer, 1820)
 Cepaea hortensis (O. F. Müller, 1774)
 Cepaea nemoralis (Linnaeus, 1758)
 Cornu aspersum (O. F. Müller, 1774) – non-indigenous
 Helix pomatia Linnaeus, 1758
 Helix lucorum Linnaeus, 1758 – non-indigenous

Bivalvia
Margaritiferidae
 Margaritifera margaritifera (Linnaeus, 1758)

Unionidae
 Anodonta anatina: Anodonta anatina attenuata Held, 1836; Anodonta anatina rostrata Rossmässler, 1836
 Anodonta cygnea: Anodonta cygnaea deplanata M. Gallenstein, 1852; Anodonta cygnaea solearis Held, 1839
 Pseudanodonta complanata (Rossmässler, 1835)
 Unio crassus: Unio crassus albensis Hazay, 1835; Unio crassus cytherea Küster, 1833; Unio crassus decurvatus Rossmässler, 1835
 Unio pictorum latirostris Küster, 1835
 Unio tumidus zelebori Zelebor, 1851
 Sinanodonta woodiana (Lea, 1834) – non-indigenous

Corbiculidae
 Corbicula fluminea (O. F. Müller, 1774) – non-indigenous

Sphaeriidae
 Pisidium amnicum (O. F. Müller, 1774)
 Pisidium casertanum (Poli, 1791)
 Pisidium conventus (Clessin, 1877)
 Pisidium globulare (Clessin, 1873)
 Pisidium henslowanum (Sheppard, (1823)
 Pisidium hibernicum (Westerlund, 1834)
 Pisidium lilljeborgii (Clessin, 1886)
 Pisidium milium (Held, 18369
 Pisidium moitessierianum (Paladilhe, 1836)
 Pisidium nitidum (Jenyns, 1832)
 Pisidium obtusale (Lamarck, 1818)
 Pisidium personatum (Malm, 1855)
 Pisidium pseudosphaerium (J. Favre, 1927)
 Pisidium subtruncatum (Malm, 1855)
 Pisidium supinum (A. Schmidt, 1851)
 Pisidium tenuilineatum ((Stelfox, 1918)
 Musculium lacustre (O. F. Müller, 1774)
 Sphaerium corneum (Linnaeus, 1758)
 Sphaerium nucleus (S. Studer, 1820)
 Sphaerium ovale (A. Férrusac, 1807)
 Sphaerium rivicola (Lamarck, 1818)

Dreissenidae
 Dreissena polymorpha (Pallas, 1771) – non-indigenous
 Dreissena bugensis Andrusov, 1897 – non-indigenous

Hothouse alien species
Hothouse aliens in Austria include:
 Cantareus apertus (Born, 1778)
 Caracollina lenticula (Michaud, 1831)
 Galba cubensis (C. Pfeiffer, 1839)
 Hawaiia minuscula (Binney, 1840)
 Lamellaxis clavulinus (Potiez & Michaud, 1838)
 Lehmannia nyctelia ((Bourguignat, 1861)
 Lehmannia valentiana (A. ferrussac, 1823)
 Milax nigricans (Philipi, 1836)
 Opeas pumilum (L. Pfeiffer, 1840)
 Oxychilus translucidus (Mortillet, 1854)
 Physella hendersoni (Clench, 1825)
 Radix javanica (Mousson, 1894)
 Sitala rumbangensis (E. Smith, 1895)
 Tandonia sowerbyi (A. Ferrussac, 1823)
 Veronicella sp.
 Zonitoides arboreus (Say, 1816)

Alien species in hot springs
Following species occur as aliens in natural hot springs:
Ampullaria paludosa (Say, 1829)
Melanoides tuberculata (O. F. Müller, 1774)
Planorbella duryi (Wetherby, 1879)
Pseudosuccinea columella (Say, 1817)

See also
Lists of molluscs of surrounding countries:
 List of non-marine molluscs of Germany
 List of non-marine molluscs of the Czech Republic
 List of non-marine molluscs of Slovakia
 List of non-marine molluscs of Hungary
 List of non-marine molluscs of Slovenia
 List of non-marine molluscs of Italy
 List of non-marine molluscs of Switzerland
 List of non-marine molluscs of Liechtenstein

References

Further reading
Klemm W. (1974). "Die Verbreitung der rezenten Land-Gehäuse-Schnecken in Österreich. [Distribution of recent landsnails in Austria]". Denkschriften der Österrerreichischen Akademie der Wissenschaften (mathematisch-naturwissenschaftliche Klasse) 117: 1–503, Wien. 
Reischütz P. L. (1986). "Die Verbreitung der Nacktschnecken Österreichs. [Distribution of Austrian slugs](Arionidae, Milacidae, Limacidae, Agriolimacidae, Boettgerilidae)." (Supplement 2 des Catalogus Faunae Austriae). Sitzungsberichte der Österreichischen Akademie der Wissenschaften (mathematisch-naturwissenschaftliche Klasse) 195: 67–190. 
Zulka P. (ed.) (2007). "Rote Listen gefährdeter Tiere Österreichs. [Red lists of the endangered animals of Austria]". Checklisten, Gefährdungsanalysen, Handlungsbedarf. Teil 2. Grüne Reihe des BLFUW. Wien, Böhlauverlag.

External links
 Checklist of Austrian Mollusca: Complete list of all species and subspecies. Names of genera sometimes differ from those used in Wikipedia.
 Society MoFa – Mollusc Research Austria, Austrian platform for mollusc researchers
 Kartierung der Wassermollusken Salzburgs (Mapping of Freshwater Molluscs in Salzburg) 
 Working group Alpine land snails at the Naturhistorisches Museum Wien

Non-marine molluscs
Austria
Austria
Austria